Igor Nikolayevich Tikhonov (born 13 December 1969) is a Russian professional football coach and a former player. Currently, he is the lead assistant manager for FC Tekstilshchik Ivanovo.

Club career
He made his debut in the Russian Premier League in 1996 for FC KAMAZ-Chally Naberezhnye Chelny.

Honours
 Russian Second Division Zone West top scorer: 1994 (29 goals).

External links
 

1969 births
Sportspeople from Ivanovo
Living people
Soviet footballers
Russian footballers
Association football forwards
FC KAMAZ Naberezhnye Chelny players
FC Rubin Kazan players
Russian Premier League players
FC Tekstilshchik Ivanovo players
Russian football managers
FC Torpedo Vladimir players